Daniel Navarrete (born 6 January 1963) is an Argentine former wrestler. He competed at the 1984 Summer Olympics and the 1988 Summer Olympics.

References

External links
 

1963 births
Living people
Argentine male sport wrestlers
Olympic wrestlers of Argentina
Wrestlers at the 1984 Summer Olympics
Wrestlers at the 1988 Summer Olympics
Place of birth missing (living people)
Pan American Games medalists in wrestling
Pan American Games silver medalists for Argentina
Wrestlers at the 1991 Pan American Games
Medalists at the 1991 Pan American Games
20th-century Argentine people
21st-century Argentine people